Ama Codjoe is an American social justice activist, dancer and a Pushcart-nominated poet. 

She was a Cave Canem fellow, a Callaloo Writers Workshop fellow, and one of Black Bottom’s Tuesday Poets. Codjoe received the Rona Jaffe Graduate Fellowship from New York University and is the former Associate Director of Professional Development for the DreamYard Art Center.

Education 

 Codjoe received her M.F.A. in Dance Performance from Ohio State University.

References 

Living people
1979 births
Ohio State University alumni
People from Travis County, Texas
American women poets
21st-century American women writers
21st-century American poets